Julia's House is a children's hospice located in Corfe Mullen, Dorset, England and Devizes, Wiltshire. It is a hospice for children with life-limiting, life-threatening or terminal conditions. The majority of the children who are cared for by Julia's House are unlikely to live beyond the age of 18. The hospice costs £1.9 million to be maintained. Only 3% of this cost is provided by the government.

History
Julia's House is named after Julia Perks, a paediatric nurse who died from cancer in 1997. Julia highlighted the need for facilities and services for children with life-limiting and life-threatening illnesses in the Dorset area. She particularly wanted to raise awareness of the need for more respite for the families of these children. Julia's House was founded by Michael Wise, who was the local councillor of Julia Perks. Wise helped the hospice to raise £15,000 in 2008.

The charity began in 2003, when Julia's House appointed two children's community nurses, who started working in home care for terminally ill children. Julia's House began with its main effort on providing care in the families' own homes.

Before being converted into a hospice, Julia's House was once a family home. In March 2006, it became a hospice that is an area for children to play and relax during the day. It also provides an occasional overnight service for 3 children and home care for 50 children. The chief executive of the hospice is Martin Edwards.

Shirt controversy
In July 2008, Julia's House replaced Park Engineering as the logo on Weymouth F.C.'s shirts. This deal was made to raise the profile of both the charity and the football club. It was a free sponsorship deal. However, a number of people became concerned that Julia's House was paying Weymouth F.C. for the shirt deal so that the charity could have more publicity. When the charity began losing fundraising money due to this controversy, it denied these beliefs, and Mike Bartlett, the development director at Julia's House, issued the following statement:

References

External links
 Official website

Children's charities based in the United Kingdom
Organizations established in 2003